Villarica may refer to:
 Villarica (genus), a genus of moth
 Villarica, Cotabato, a barangay of Midsayap, Philippines

People
 Henry Villarica, politician and attorney
 Linabelle Villarica, incumbent mayor of Meycauayan

See also 
 Villa Rica (disambiguation)
 Villaricca, Italy
 Villarrica (disambiguation)